Xu Yong may refer to:

Xu Yong (historian) (徐勇, born 1949)
Xu Yong (general) (许勇; born 1959)
Eric Xu or Xu Yong (徐勇, born 1964), co-founder of Baidu
Xu Yong (basketball) (born 1989)
 Xu Yong, photographer and co-founder of the 798 Art Zone
 Xu Yong (徐勇, born 1955), Chinese doctor, member of the Eleventh CPPCC National Committee

See also
Xuyong County